Dar Shur Ab-e Pain (also Romanized as Dar Shūr Āb-e Pā’īn; also known as Darshūr-e Pā’īn) is a village in Ravar Rural District, in the Central District of Ravar County, Kerman Province, Iran. At the 2006 census, its population was 24, in 7 families.

References 

Populated places in Ravar County